Serhiy Vakulenko (born 7 September 1993) is a Ukrainian footballer who plays as a midfielder for Armenian Premier League club Pyunik.

Career
Vakulenko is a product of the UFK Kharkiv and FC Shakhtar youth sportive schools.

Ararat-Armenia
On 6 June 2022, Ararat-Armenia announced that Vakulenko's contract had expired and he would leave the club.

Pyunik Yerevan
In Summer 2022, he signed for Pyunik Yerevan just champion of Armenian Premier League in the season 2021–22.

National Team
He was called up to play for the 23-man squad of the Ukraine national under-21 football team by trainer Serhiy Kovalets in the Commonwealth of Independent States Cup in January 2014.

Career statistics

Club

Honours

Ararat-Armenia
Armenian Premier League (1): 2019–20
Armenian Premier League (1): Runner Up 2021–22

References

External links
 
 

1993 births
Living people
Ukrainian footballers
Ukraine under-21 international footballers
Ukraine youth international footballers
Ukrainian expatriate footballers
Association football defenders
Footballers from Kharkiv
FC Shakhtar-3 Donetsk players
FC Mariupol players
Ukrainian Premier League players
Ukrainian First League players
Ukrainian Second League players
FC Olimpik Donetsk players
FC Arsenal Kyiv players
FC Karpaty Lviv players
FC Ararat-Armenia players
Armenian Premier League players
Expatriate footballers in Armenia
Ukrainian expatriate sportspeople in Armenia